David Owen Dryden (July 1, 1877 – June 4, 1946) was a renowned San Diego builder-architect best known for his craftsman-style bungalows in the suburbs north of San Diego's Balboa Park including the North Park, Mission Hills and University Heights neighborhoods. Most of Dryden's work was constructed between 1911 and 1919. The Dryden Historic District in North Park contains a high concentration of his homes.

 Dryden's homes typify the American Arts and Crafts Movement. 
Dryden died on June 4, 1946 in Crescent City, California.

Dryen expert Donald Covington noted "it is a tribute to the quality of his craft that most of David Dryden's houses from his early career in San Diego are extant. Many of them, having survived modernization and change, still grace the old suburban neighborhoods north of Balboa Park echoing the polite and serene lifestyle of a distant era."

Designs in San Diego

 1912: 3120 Granada Avenue 
 1912: 3039 Palm Street 
 1912: 3136 Granada Avenue 
 1912: *3419 30th Street 

 1912: 3427 Kansas (29th) Street 
 1912: 3532 Ray Street 
 1912: *4505 Del Mar 
 1912: 3524 30th Street 
 1912: 3049 Palm Street 
 1913: 3548 Granada Avenue
 1913: *3031 Landis Street 
 1913: *3648 Ray Street 
 1913: 2203 Cliff Street 
 1913: 3820 Center Street 
 1913: 4720 Panorama Street 
 1913: 3511 Utah 
 1913: 3634 Utah 
 1914: 2230 Adams Avenue 
 1914: 2242 Adams Avenue 
 1914: 4724 Panorama Street 
 1914: 4780 Panorama Street 
 1914: *4525 Kansas Street 
 1914: 3586 30th Street 
 1914: 3044 Goldsmith 
 1914: 3036 Goldsmith 
 1914: 3136 Goldsmith 
 1914: 3221 Homer 
 1915: 3553 28th Street 
 1915: 3571 28th Street 
 1915: *Ventura Place & Ocean Walk 
 1915: 3546 28th Street 
 1915: 3536 28th Street 
 1915: 1801 Sheridan Street 
 1915: *2042 Albatross Street 
 1916: 3446 28th Street
 1916: 3516 28th Street 
 1916: 3505 28th Street 
 1916: 3614 28th Street 
 1916: 3712 28th Street 
 1916: 3676 28th Street 
 1916: 1212 Arbor Drive 
 1916: 3554 28th Street 
 1916: Merivale Ave. & Bonnie Brae 
 1917: 3412 28th Street 
 1917: 3503 Pershing Avenue 
 1917: 3575 Pershing Avenue 
 1917: 2710 Landis – remodel 
 1917: 3706 28th Street 
 1917: 3559 Pershing Avenue 
 1917: 3543 Pershing Avenue 
 1917: 3640 28th Street – (remodel) 
 1917: 4244 Jackdaw Street 
 1917: 1612 Grove Street 
 1918: 3527 Pershing Avenue 
 1918: 3367 Granada Avenue 
 1918: 4315 Avalon Drive 
 1918: *1632–35 Ninth Avenue 
 1918: 3511 Pershing Avenue 
 1918: 3728 Pershing Avenue 
 1918: 3388 Granada Avenue

          * Non-extant or significantly altered structure.

References

External links
 Article on David Owen Dryden by Dryden expert Donald Covington.
 NorthParkHistory.org.

1877 births
1946 deaths
American Craftsman architects
American Craftsman architecture in California
People from San Diego
Architects from California
20th-century American architects